Joy Amechi Eze (born 23 April 1988) is a Nigerian sprinter who specializes in the 400 metres. Her personal best time is 51.20 seconds, set during the 2007 All-Africa Games.

In 2006, she won silver medals in 4x400 metres relay at the 2006 Commonwealth Games and the 2006 World Junior Championships. At the 2007 All-Africa Games she won the silver medal in 400 m and a 4x400 metres relay gold medal. At the 2008 African Championships she finished sixth in 400 m and won another 4x400 metres gold medal.

Eze also competed individually at the 2006 Commonwealth Games and the 2007 World Championships without reaching the finals.

Achievements

External links

1988 births
Living people
Igbo sportspeople
Nigerian female sprinters
Nigerian female middle-distance runners
Athletes (track and field) at the 2006 Commonwealth Games
Commonwealth Games silver medallists for Nigeria
Commonwealth Games medallists in athletics
African Games gold medalists for Nigeria
African Games medalists in athletics (track and field)
African Games silver medalists for Nigeria
Athletes (track and field) at the 2003 All-Africa Games
Athletes (track and field) at the 2007 All-Africa Games
Athletes (track and field) at the 2008 Summer Olympics
Olympic athletes of Nigeria
21st-century Nigerian women
Medallists at the 2006 Commonwealth Games